This is a partial list of learned societies, professional bodies and engineering societies operating in Ireland:

 Accounting Technicians Ireland, formerly the Institute of Accounting Technicians in Ireland (IATI)
 Archives and Records Association, Ireland†
 Bar Council of Ireland
 British and Irish Association of Law Librarians
 British Computer Society†
 Chartered Accountants Ireland
 Dublin Philosophical Society
 Galway Archaeological and Historical Society
 Geographical Society of Ireland†
 Honorable Society of King's Inns
 Institute of Chartered Accountants in Ireland (ICAI)
 Institute of Chemistry of Ireland
 Institute of Physics ‡
 Institution of Engineers of Ireland
 Irish Archaeological Society
 Irish Association of Physicists in Medicine (IAPM)¥
Irish Concrete Society
 Irish Computer Society¥
 Irish Hospitality Institute
 Irish Institute of Legal Executives
 Irish Institute of Medical Herbalists
 Irish Manuscripts Commission
 Irish Mathematical Society
 Irish Medical Organisation
 Irish Nutrition and Dietetic Institute
 Irish Planning Institute
 Irish Professional Photographers Association
 Irish Recorded Music Association
 Irish Texts Society
 Institute and Faculty of Actuaries
 Institute of Physics and Engineering in Medicine (IPEM)†
 Kilkenny Archaeological Society
 Law Society of Ireland
 Library Association of Ireland
 Microscopical Society of Ireland†
 Pathological Society of Great Britain and Ireland
 Pharmaceutical Society Of Ireland
 Psychological Society of Ireland
 Royal Academy of Medicine in Ireland
 Royal Anthropological Institute of Great Britain and Ireland
 Royal College of Surgeons in Ireland
 Royal College of Physicians of Ireland
 Royal Dublin Society
 Royal Geological Society of Ireland
 Royal Hibernian Academy
 Royal Institute of the Architects of Ireland
 Royal Irish Academy
 Royal Microscopical Society‡
 Royal Society of Antiquaries of Ireland
 Society of Chartered Surveyors Ireland
 School of Irish Learning
 Society of Actuaries in Ireland
 Society for Musicology in Ireland
 Zoological Society of Ireland

‡ Established before partition, and represents professionals both in Britain and Ireland

† Established after partition, and represents professionals both in Britain and Northern Ireland

¥ Primarily operates in the Republic of Ireland

See also
 List of Ireland-related topics
 List of Irish cultural institutions
 List of learned societies

 
 
Learned societies